Devika Daftardar is an Indian actress who works in Marathi theatre and films. She is known for her mother roles in Pari Hoon Main (2018) and Naal (2018).

Career 
Devika started her career in Marathi plays before moving on to films. She starred in several Marathi films including Pari Hoon Main (2018) opposite Nandu Madhav before getting her breakthrough for her portrayal of a mother in Naal (2018).

Filmography 
All films are in Marathi, unless otherwise indicated.

References

External links 

Actresses in Telugu cinema
Actresses in Marathi cinema
Actresses in Marathi theatre
Year of birth missing (living people)
Living people
Indian film actresses
21st-century Indian actresses